

Lake Gilles is a locality in the Australian state of South Australia located on the Eyre Peninsula about  north west of the state capital of Adelaide and about  to the north-east  of the town of Kimba.

Lake Gilles consists of the water body known as Lake Gilles and a parcel of land to the lake's immediate south all of which is within the boundaries of the protected area, the Lake Gilles Conservation Park.  Accordingly, the sole land use within the locality is conservation.  The section of the Eyre Highway between Kimba in the west and Iron Knob in the east passes through the locality.

The locality was established on 26 April 2013 in respect to “the long established local name.”  Its name is derived from the lake of the same name which is located within the boundaries of the locality.

The 2016 Australian census which was conducted in August 2016 reports that Lake Gilles had no people living within its boundaries.

Lake Gilles is located within the federal Division of Grey, the state electoral district of Giles, the District Council of Kimba, the Pastoral Unincorporated Area of South Australia and the state’s Far North region.

References

Towns in South Australia
Eyre Peninsula
Far North (South Australia)
Places in the unincorporated areas of South Australia